Cancer Cytopathology is a monthly peer-reviewed scientific journal which covers practice of cytopathology and its related oncology-based disciplines. It is one of three official journals of the American Cancer Society and is published by Wiley-Blackwell on behalf of the society. The current editor-in-chief is William C. Faquin. Cancer Cytopathology was published as a section of Cancer from 1997 until 2008 when it was split into a separate journal.

Abstracting and indexing
The journal is abstracted and indexed in:

According to the Journal Citation Reports, the journal has a 2020 impact factor of 5.284, ranking it 16th out of 77 journals in the category "Pathology" and 83rd out of 242 journals in "Oncology".

References

Oncology journals
Publications established in 1948
Bimonthly journals
English-language journals
Wiley-Blackwell academic journals
Academic journals associated with learned and professional societies
American Cancer Society